The 2010 TOYO Tires Dubai 24 Hour was the fifth running of the Dubai 24 Hour endurance race. The race was held at the Dubai Autodrome and was organized by the promoter Creventic. The official event commenced on 14 January and finished on 16 January 2010.

The race was won by the A6 class IMSA Performance Matmut team, with Raymond Narac, Patrick Pilet and Marco Holzer piloting the team's Porsche 997 GT3 RSR to a race record distance, covering 608 laps over the 24 Hours. The podium was completed by a pair of A5 class BMW Z4 M-Coupés; the Petronas Syntium Team of Nobuteru Taniguchi, Masataka Yanagida, Fariqe Hairuman, Johannes Stuck and Hiroki Yoshida finished second, behind Narac, Pilet and Holzer, and the Al Faisal Racing team finished third, two laps behind the Petronas team, with a driving quartet of Abdulaziz and Khaled Al Faisal, Marko Hartung and Claudia Hürtgen. Other classes were won by BMW Team Hungary with Efficient Dynamics (11th overall, D2 class), Team Black Falcon (12th, SP2 class, and 31st, A4 class), Bovi Motorsport (13th, SP1 class), AUH Motorsports (16th, SP3 class), SUNRED Racing Team (20th, A3T class), Team Sally Racing (30th, A2 class), and Marcos Racing International (34th, D1 class).

Overview
Practice day for the participants was on 13 January and was split into two segments. The first segment was held at 11:30 a.m. and concluded at 12:30 a.m., giving the entrants 1 hour to prepare for the Qualifying Session. The other segment of practice was held started at 1:25 p.m. and concluded at 2:50 p.m. allowing the entrants another 1 hour 25 minutes to prepare their cars for the Qualifying Session. The Qualifying session was held on the same day as practice and commenced at 3:30 p.m. and concluded at 5:00 p.m.

The race itself commenced on 15 January at exactly 2:00 p.m. with the weather being Sunny and warm. A total of 75 vehicles made up the grid for the 2010 Dubai 24 Hour which was down from last years number of 78 vehicles. Nonetheless, the Endurance Event lasted for the full 24 Hours and as such finished at 2:00 p.m. on 16 January.

Qualifying
The Qualifying Session for the 2010 Dubai 24 Hour commenced on 13 January at 3:30 p.m. with the session lasting for 1 hour 30 minutes, concluding at 5:00 p.m. Unlike the previous edition of the race in which the Top Ten was dominated by different variants of Porsche 911s, this year saw a mixture of 911s, a Mosler MT900, a number of BMW Z4 Coupes and a GT3-spec Ascari KZ1-R GT. However, Pole position was once again occupied by a Porsche entered by the IMSA Performance Matmut crew with a blistering time of 2:02.701.

Race
The first eight hours saw a lot of action that involved some of the possible contenders for a podium finish. Among the early retirements were the Auto Racing Club Bratislava-Porsche (Miroslav Konopka-Oliver Morley-Sean Edwards-Richard Cvörnjek) and the Besaplast Racing Team-Porsche (Franjo Kovac-Martin Tschornia-Kurt Thiim-Roland Asch-Sebastian Asch). The latter team that finished third in last year's race was out of contention after their car caught fire on the main straight with Martin Tschornia behind the wheel, seven and a half hours into the race. The unfortunate driver escaped unscathed, but the car was damaged beyond immediate repair.

Last year's winners, the No.1 Land Motorsport-Porsche (Gabriel Abergel-Xavier Pompidou-Carsten Tilke-Otto Klohs) were sidelined as well after Tilke had over-revved the engine. Almost at the same time, the number 148-AF Corse Ferrari (Robert Kaufmann-Michael Waltrip-Marcos Ambrose-Rui Águas-Niki Cadei) became involved in a collision with the car of NASCAR-star Michael Waltrip, who was in his first-ever 24-hour race in Dubai. Michael Waltrip couldn't avoid the collision when the other car started swerving in front of him. The Ferrari F430 also incurred considerable damage and retired. Up to the time of the accident, the car had always been in the top ten, running as high as sixth.

In the opening half of the race, the pace was set by the two IMSA Performance Matmut-Porsches and the BMWs of the Petronas Syntium Team and Al Faisal Racing. However, the IMSA Performance Matmut team No.65's hopes were dealt a severe blow when the clutch had to be replaced on the car in the twelfth hour of the race. Later on, the car retired due to gearbox failure.

In the end, the No.66 IMSA Performance Matmut team-Porsche 997 GT3-RSR was able to match its blistering Pole position performance with a solid final hour in the race to pen up a 2 Lap lead over the 2nd placed Petronas Syntium Team-BMW Z4 Coupe and take the victory. Though the Z4 Coupe GT was lapping faster in the final 20 minutes, the Porsche's reliability kept a solid gap between the two vehicles allowing for Porsche to win their third-straight Dubai 24 Hour.

The Japanese Petronas Synthium team also raced in Dubai for the first time. They had their pair of BMW Z4s in the top five for most of the race, but the second car (Tatsuya Kataoka-Manabu Orido-Johan Adzmi-Kosuke Matsuura-Hiroki Yoshida) retired with half an hour remaining. A good performance was shown by the BMW Team Hungary with Efficient Dynamics. The BMW 120D driven by Lázlò Palik-János Vida-Csaba Walter-Gábor Weber finished eleventh overall out of the 75 participating cars, winning the D2-class for diesel-powered cars. The Hungarian Brokernet Silversting sportscar was also successful, winning the SP1 category with Kalman Bodis-Attila Barta-Istvàn Ràcz-Wolfgang Kaufmann driving for the Bovi Motorsport team. Leading the A3T-class, the SEAT Leon of the Spanish SUNRED team (Oscar Nogues-Michael Rossi-Ferran Monje-Borja Veiga) was in the top ten for a long time, but dropped back after a collision. Still, the SUNRED team scored a 1–2 in this class.

The German Black Falcon team that has won the title in the German Langstreckenmeisterschaft Nürburgring for the past two years also had a very successful debut in Dubai, winning the SP2-class with the BMW M3 (Vimal Metha-Sean Patrick Breslin-Sean Paul Breslin-Christer Jöns-Alexander Böhm) and the A4-class with the BMW Z4 Coupé (Oleg Volin-Andrii Lebed-Marc Colell-Kai Riebetz-Alexander Böhm). There was local success for the AUH Motorsport team that won the SP3-class with the Aston Martin V8 Vantage, driven by Humaid Al Masaood-Alex Kapadia-Michael Prophet-Eric Charles. The A2-class brought victory for Team Sally Racing from Denmark, their Renault Clio driven by Anders Maigaard-Dan Brian Träger-Martin Sally Pederson-Brian Borger-Mick Reimerson. Victory in the D1 class, last but not least, went to the Marcos Racing International BMW 120D of Jim Briody-Hal Prewitt-Toto Lassally-Cor Euser.

References

External links
 

Dubai 24 Hour
Dubai 24 Hour
Dubai 24 Hour